Elections to Manchester City Council were held on 6 May 2010, on the same day as the 2010 UK General Election. One-third of the council was up for election, with each successful candidate to serve a four-year term of office, expiring in 2014. Since the election there had been a further defection from the Liberal Democrats to Labour. Labour held overall control of the council, on a high turnout - owing to the general election on the same day - of 50.9%.

Election result

After the election, the composition of the council was as follows:

Ward results

Ancoats and Clayton

Ardwick

Baguley

Bradford

Brooklands

Burnage

Charlestown

Cheetham

Chorlton

Chorlton Park

City Centre

Crumpsall

Didsbury East

Didsbury West

Fallowfield

Gorton North

Gorton South

Harpurhey

Higher Blackley

Hulme

Levenshulme

Longsight

Miles Platting and Newton Heath

Moss Side

Moston

Northenden

Old Moat

Rusholme

Sharston

Whalley Range

Withington

Woodhouse Park

By-elections between 2010 and 2011

References

Manchester
Manchester
2010
2010s in Manchester